"On the Loose" is a song by Australian pop singer-songwriter Marty Rhone. It was released in Australia in December 1976 as the lead single from his second studio album, Marty Rhone. The song peaked at number 33 on The Australian chart.

Track listing
7" single (MS-200)'''
Side A "On the Loose" - 2:33
Side B "You Can't Have Me" - 2:54

Charts

References

1976 singles
1976 songs
EMI Records singles